See You on the Other Side is the third studio album by American neo-psychedelia band Mercury Rev, released in 1995 by record label Beggars Banquet.

Content 

This was the first Mercury Rev album following the departure of former lead singer Dave Baker. It also marks a transition between the earlier, noisier sound of their first two releases to the more orchestrated, soft and lush arrangements the band would embrace on subsequent albums.

The title for the album comes from what Dave Fridmann would say to the band members before going onstage.

The album cover is taken from a 1975 7 Up commercial entitled 'Uncola'. The album's back cover is a photograph of Donahue despondently loading a revolver.

The video for "Young Man's Stride" was directed by Moby.

Track listing

Personnel 
Adapted from the liner notes
 Dave Fridmann – Bass Explore, B-3, Pianos, Dual Vocals
 Jonathan Donahue – Vocals, Harmony Rocket Guitars, Guitorgan, Bowed Saws and Sounds
 Jimy Chambers – Drumming, Mojo Stick, Wurlitzer Electric Pianos
 Grasshopper – Guitar Shapes, Single Exhaust Clarinet, Tettix Wave Accumulator®
 Suzanne Thorpe – Quartz Arhoolie Flutes, French Horns

All Horns and Strings arranged by Donahue/Grasshopper, except "Sudden Ray of Hope" by Chambers/Thorpe

 Mark Marinoff – Saxophones
 Matt Jordan – Trumpets
 Rachel Handman – Strings
 Chris Reilly – Tablas
 Jake Congelo – Piano on "Peaceful Night"
 Carmen Quinoñes – Female Vocals on "Racing the Tide" and "Close Encounters of the 3rd Grade"
 Tomcat Stamos – Expressed Male Interruptions on "Close Encounters of the 3rd Grade"

References 

Mercury Rev albums
1995 albums
Albums produced by Dave Fridmann